Maria Jane Mackay (née Taylor, 21 July 1844 – 5 February 1933) was a New Zealand founding mother, midwife and nurse. She was born on Norfolk Island on 21 July 1844.

References

1844 births
1933 deaths
New Zealand nurses
New Zealand midwives
Australian emigrants to New Zealand
People from Norfolk Island
19th-century New Zealand people
New Zealand women nurses